This is a complete List of National Historic Landmarks in New Mexico.  New Mexico has 46 National Historic Landmarks (NHLs), including Raton Pass which is shared with Colorado, and listed by the National Park Service as in that state.

Current NHLs
The NHLs are distributed across 22 of New Mexico's 33 counties.

|}

Historic areas of the NPS in New Mexico
National Historical Parks, some National Monuments, and certain other areas listed in the National Park system are historic landmarks of national importance that are highly protected already, often before the inauguration of the NHL program in 1960, and are then often not also named NHLs per se. There are nine of these in New Mexico. The National Park Service lists these fourteen together with the NHLs in the state.

See also
List of Registered Historic Places in New Mexico
List of National Historic Landmarks by state

References

External links 

New Mexico
 
National Historic Landmarks
National Historic Landmarks